Nyanza Football Club was an association football club based in Nyanza, Rwanda. The team played its home games at the Nyanza Stadium.

In 2012, the club was acquired by Rayon Sports, who are also based in the town of Nyanza.

References

External links
Soccerway
Calciozz

Football clubs in Rwanda